Wuliwuli (also Wuli Wuli, Wulli Wulli) is an extinct Australian Aboriginal language of the Pama–Nyungan language family formerly spoken by the Wulli Wulli people in Queensland, Australia. The Wulli Wulli language region includes the landscape within the local government boundaries of the North Burnett Regional Council, particularly the town of Eidsvold and the Auburn River catchment, including the properties of Walloon, Camboon, and Hawkwood. Wuliwuli is regarded as a dialect of Wakka Wakka.

Vocabulary 
Some words from the Wulli Wulli language, as spelt and written by Wulli Wulli authors include:

 Ban: grass
 Djigum: sun
 Dungir: river
 Gahr: echidna
 Gamba dunba: good day
 Goolah: koala
 Gung: water
 Gunyar: bird
 Guraman: kangaroo
 Guyu: fish
 Moran: home/camp
 Nyilung: land
 Wangun: snake

References

Waka–Kabic languages
Extinct languages of Queensland